Mark Nicholls (born 30 May 1977) is an English former professional footballer who played as a striker from 1994 until 2012, most notably in the Premier League for Chelsea. He was assistant manager to Neil Shipperley at North Greenford United before the pair left after the 2011–12 season. He then returned with Shipperley to North Greenford United in October 2012 after Jon-Barrie Bates left by mutual consent.

He also played in the Football League for Reading, Grimsby Town, Colchester United and Torquay United, as well as playing in the Scottish Football League for Partick Thistle, Hamilton Academical and Clydebank.

Playing career

Chelsea
Nicholls was born in Hillingdon, London. A forward, he began his career as a trainee with Chelsea, turning professional in August 1995. He made his league debut in the 1996–97 season, after gaining experience on loan with non-league Chertsey Town, but made a real breakthrough into the Chelsea side the following season, appearing in 18 Premier League games in 1997–98. That season he also scored three league goals; one after coming on as a substitute as Chelsea won 6–1 at rivals Tottenham Hotspur in December 1997, and two more, again after coming on as a substitute, against Coventry City the following month. That season Chelsea also won the 1997–98 League Cup and the 1997–98 UEFA Cup Winners' Cup. Nicholls wasn't part of the squad for either final but contributed two appearances to each of the cup runs. At the start of the League Cup run Chelsea needed a penalty shoot-out to beat Blackburn Rovers, and Nicholls scored the winning penalty to send Chelsea through.

However, as the number of foreign imports grew at Stamford Bridge, he fell further out of the reckoning and joined Reading on loan in December 1999 with a view to a permanent move. Despite scoring three goals including one on his debut, the move fell through and on 10 February he returned to a peripheral role at Stamford Bridge. He joined Grimsby Town on loan on 24 February 2000, and then Colchester United on loan on 6 October the following season. He had an unsuccessful trial with Motherwell in March 2001 and was released by Chelsea at the end of the season, having scored three times in 36 league games, although 25 of those appearances were as a substitute.

Latter career
In May 2001 he joined Aberdeen on trial, but nothing came of it and by July he was playing for Aldershot Town, and later had a trial with Swindon Town. He joined Partick Thistle on non-contract terms on 18 August 2001, but played just once in a 1–0 home win over Inverness Caledonian Thistle.

He joined Torquay United on non-contract terms on 7 September 2001, making his debut in the 1–0 home defeat against local rivals Plymouth Argyle the following day when he came on as an 81st-minute substitute for Kevin Hill. He played nine times for Roy McFarland's side, scoring once against Darlington, before being released on 25 October, having failed to adapt to Third Division football.

Soon after, he began a trial at Hamilton Academical, signing for them on 3 November in time to make his debut in a 3–0 defeat away to Forfar Athletic. However, he played only once more for the Accies, scoring twice in the 3–2 defeat at home to Stenhousemuir a week later, before joining Clydebank on 24 November. With Clydebank going out of business in the 2002 close-season, Nicholls joined non-league Chesham United, but moved to Maidenhead United soon after.

In October 2003 he moved to Northwood, leaving for Hendon in the summer of 2004. He was appointed as player-assistant manager of Hendon in December 2004, but in February 2005 he signed for Uxbridge, but left to join Hayes the following summer. In September 2006 he rejoined Northwood only to re-sign for Uxbridge in January 2007.

However, Nicholls has a reputation in non-league circles for a poor disciplinary record. On 13 January 2009 he was one of three Uxbridge players sent off in the first half of their FA Trophy tie against Swindon Supermarine, the West London side eventually going down to a 6–1 defeat. Nicholls left the club by mutual consent soon after this game, to sign for divisional rivals Beaconsfield SYCOB where he was rumoured to play an instrumental part in an end of season brawl at AFC Totton. He was also dismissed after being accused of spitting at a referee during his six-month spell at Hendon and collected a series of yellow cards for dissent at the club.

Coaching career
On 26 December 2011, Nicholls decided to join former manager and his former Chelsea teammate Neil Shipperley at North Greenford United as assistant manager. He made his debut for North Greenford United on 2 January 2012 during a 1–1 draw away at his former side Northwood, coming on in the 90th minute for Ricky Pither.

On 28 October 2020, Nicholls took over as first team manager at FC Clacton - a role he held until October 2021.

Career statistics

Honours 
Hendon

 George Ruffell Memorial Shield: 2004

References

External links

1977 births
Living people
Footballers from Hillingdon
English footballers
Northwood F.C. players
Chelsea F.C. players
Chertsey Town F.C. players
Reading F.C. players
Grimsby Town F.C. players
Colchester United F.C. players
Aldershot Town F.C. players
Partick Thistle F.C. players
Torquay United F.C. players
Hamilton Academical F.C. players
Clydebank F.C. (1965) players
Chesham United F.C. players
Maidenhead United F.C. players
Hendon F.C. players
Uxbridge F.C. players
Hayes F.C. players
Beaconsfield Town F.C. players
Walton Casuals F.C. players
North Greenford United F.C. players
Southall F.C. players
F.C. Clacton managers
Premier League players
English Football League players
Scottish Football League players
Isthmian League players
National League (English football) players
Southern Football League players
Association football forwards